The Montana-class battleships were planned as successors of the  for the United States Navy, to be slower but larger, better armored, and with superior firepower. Five were approved for construction during World War II, but changes in wartime building priorities resulted in their cancellation in favor of continuing production of s and Iowa-class battleships before any Montana-class keels were laid.

Their intended armament would have been twelve  Mark 7 guns in four 3-gun turrets, up from the nine Mark 7 guns in three turrets used by the Iowa class. Unlike the three preceding classes of battleships, the Montana class was designed without any restrictions from treaty limitations. With an increased anti-aircraft capability and substantially thicker armor in all areas, the Montanas would have been the largest, best-protected, and most heavily armed US battleships ever. They also would have been the only class to rival the Empire of Japan's s in terms of displacement.

Preliminary design work for the Montana class began before the US entry into World War II. The first two vessels were approved by Congress in 1939 following the passage of the Second Vinson Act. The Japanese attack on Pearl Harbor delayed the construction of the Montana class. The success of carrier combat at the Battle of the Coral Sea and, to a greater extent, the Battle of Midway, diminished the perceived value of the battleship. Consequently, the US Navy chose to cancel the Montana class in favor of more urgently needed aircraft carriers as well as amphibious and anti-submarine vessels.

Because the Iowas were far enough along in construction and urgently needed to operate alongside the new Essex-class aircraft carriers, their orders were retained, making them the last US Navy battleships to be commissioned.

History 
As the political situation in Europe and Asia deteriorated in the prelude to World War II, Carl Vinson, the chairman of the House Committee on Naval Affairs, instituted the Vinson Naval Plan. It aimed to get the Navy into fighting shape after the cutbacks imposed by the Great Depression and the two London Naval Treaties of the 1930s. As part of the overall plan, Congress passed the Second Vinson Act in 1938, which was promptly signed by President Franklin D. Roosevelt and cleared the way for construction of the four  fast battleships and the first two  fast battleships (hull numbers BB-61 and BB-62). Four additional battleships (with hull numbers BB-63, BB-64, BB-65, and BB-66) were approved for construction on 12 July 1940, with the last two intended to be the first ships of the Montana class.

The Navy had been considering large battleship design schemes since 1938 to counter the threat posed by potential battleships of the Imperial Japanese Navy, which had refused to sign the Second London Naval Treaty and furthermore refused to provide details about its s.

The increased displacement limit allowed the Navy to begin evaluating 45,000-ton battleship designs, including "slow"  schemes that increased firepower and protection over previous designs and also "fast"  schemes. The "fast" design evolved into the Iowa class while the "slow" design, with main armament battery eventually settled on twelve  guns and evolution into a 60,500-ton design, was assigned the name Montana and cleared for construction by the United States Congress under the Two-Ocean Navy Act on 19 July 1940; funding for the new ships was approved in 1941.

Completion of the Montana class, and the last two Iowa-class battleships, was intended to give the US Navy a considerable advantage over any other nation, or probable combination of nations, with a total of 17 new battleships by the late 1940s. The Montanas also would have been the only American ships to rival Japan's massive  and her sister  in size and raw firepower.

Design 
Preliminary planning for the Montana-class battleships took place in 1939, when the aircraft carrier was still considered strategically less important than the battleship. The initial schemes for what would eventually become the Montana class were continuations of various 1938 design studies for a 45,000-ton "slow" battleship alternative to the "fast" battleship design that would become the Iowa class. The initial design schemes for the Montana class were given the "BB65" prefix.

In July 1939, a series of 45,000-ton BB-65 design schemes were evaluated, but in February 1940, as a result of the outbreak of World War II and the abandonment of the naval treaties, the Battleship Design Advisory Board moved to larger designs capable of simultaneously offering increased armament and protection. The design board issued a basic outline for the Montana class that called for it to be free of beam restrictions imposed by the extant Panama Canal, be 25% stronger offensively and defensively than any other battleship completed or under construction, and be capable of withstanding the new "super heavy"  armor-piercing (AP) shells used by US battleships equipped with either the 16-inch/45 cal guns or 16-inch/50 cal Mark 7 guns. No longer restricted by treaty displacement limits, naval architects were able to increase armor protection for the new BB65 design schemes, enabling the ships to withstand enemy fire equivalent to their own guns' ammunition. Consequently, the yard's number 4 dry dock had to be enlarged and the ships would be floated out rather than conventionally launched.

The larger BB-65 design studies would again settle on a main armament of twelve 16-inch/50 cal guns while providing protection against the "super heavy" AP shells. After debate at the design board about whether the Montana class should be fast, achieving the high  speed of the Iowa class, or maintain the 27-to-28-knot speed of the North Carolina and South Dakota classes, the lower speed was chosen in order to rein in size and displacement. In practice, the 27-to-28-knot speed would have still been enough to escort and defend the Pacific-based Allied fast aircraft carrier task forces, although the Montanas ability in this regard would be considerably more limited compared to the Iowas as the latter could keep up with fleet carriers at full speed. In September 1940, the 58,000-ton BB65-5A preliminary design scheme with a  powerplant, the same as the one on Iowa class, was refined and subsequently named BB-67-1 after hull numbers BB-65 and 66 were reallocated as Iowa-class ships Illinois and Kentucky.

By January 1941, the design limit for the 58,000-ton battleship plan had been reached, and consensus among those designing the battleship class was to increase the displacement to a nominal  to support the desired armor and weaponry on the ships. The secondary armament battery of ten two-gun turrets was also changed to mount the /54 cal guns instead of the 5-inch/38 cal guns used on the Iowas. The number of 40-mm Bofors anti-aircraft gun mounts also increased, while protection of the propulsion shafts changed from the extension of the belt and deck armor aft of the citadel to armored tubes in an effort to control weight growth.

By 1942, the Montana class design was further revised to BB-67-4. Aesthetically, the net design for the Montana class somewhat resembled the Iowa class since they would be equipped with the same caliber main guns and similar secondary guns; however, Montana and her sisters would have more armor, mount three more main guns in one more turret, and be  longer and  wider than the Iowa class. The final contract design was issued in June 1942. Construction was authorized by the United States Congress and the projected date of completion was estimated to be somewhere between 1 July and 1 November 1945.

Fate
The Navy ordered the ships in May 1942, but the Montana class was placed on hold because the Iowa-class battleships and the Essex-class aircraft carriers were under construction in the shipyards intended to build the Montanas. Both the Iowa and Essex classes had been given higher priorities: the Iowas as they were far along enough in construction and urgently needed to operate alongside the Essex-class carriers and defend them with 5-inch, 40 mm, and 20 mm AA guns, and the Essexes because of their ability to launch aircraft to gain and maintain air supremacy over the islands in the Pacific and intercept warships of the Imperial Japanese Navy. The entire Montana class was suspended in June 1942 following the Battle of Midway, before any of their keels had been laid. In July 1943, the construction of the Montana class was finally cancelled after the Navy fully accepted the shift in naval warfare from surface engagements to air supremacy and from battleships to aircraft carriers. Work on the new locks for the Panama Canal also ceased in 1941, owing to a shortage of steel due to the changing strategic and material priorities.

Specifications

General characteristics 
The maximum beam was  while the waterline beam was  due to the inclination of the external armor belt. The design displacement figures were  standard,  full load, and  emergency load.

The Montana design shares many characteristics with the previous classes of American fast battleships starting from the North Carolina class, such as a bulbous bow, triple bottom under the armored citadel, and twin skegs in which the inner shafts were housed. The Montanas overall construction would have made extensive use of welding for joining structural plates and homogeneous armor.

Armament 
The armament of the Montana-class battleships would have been similar to the preceding Iowa-class battleships, but with an increase in the number of primary guns and more potent secondary guns for use against enemy surface ships and aircraft. Had they been completed, the Montanas would have been gun-for-gun the most powerful battleships the United States had constructed, and the only US battleship class that would have rivaled the Imperial Japanese Navy battleships Yamato and Musashi in armament, armor, and displacement.

Main battery 

The primary armament of a Montana-class battleship would have been twelve /50 caliber Mark 7 guns, which were to be housed in four three-gun turrets: two forward and two aft. At maximum range, the projectile would have spent almost 1½ minutes in flight. The addition of the No. 4 turret would have allowed Montana to overtake Yamato as the battleship having the heaviest broadside overall; Montana and her sisters would have had a broadside of  vs.  for Yamato. Each turret would have rested within an armored barbette, but only the top of the barbette would have protruded above the main deck. The barbettes would have extended either four decks (turrets 1 and 4) or five decks (turrets 2 and 3) down. The lower spaces would have contained rooms for handling the projectiles and storing the powder bags used to fire them. Each turret would have required a crew of 94 men to operate. The turrets would not have been attached to the ship but would have rested on rollers; had any of the Montana-class ships capsized, the turrets would have fallen out. Each turret would have cost US$1.4 million, but this figure did not take into account the cost of the guns themselves.

The turrets would have been "three-gun", not "triple", because each barrel would have elevated and fired independently. The ships could fire any combination of their guns, including a broadside of all twelve. Contrary to popular belief, the ships would not have noticeably moved sideways when a broadside was fired. The guns would have had an elevation range of −5° to +45°, moving at up to 12° per second. The turrets would have rotated about 300° at about 4° per second and could even be fired back beyond the beam, which is sometimes called "over the shoulder". Within each turret, a red stripe on the wall of the turret, just inches from the railing, would have marked the boundary of the gun's recoil, providing the crew of each gun turret with a visual reference for the minimum safe distance range.

Like most US battleships in World War II, the Montana class would have been equipped with a fire control computer—in this case, the Ford Instrument Company Mk 1A Ballistic Computer, a  rangekeeper designed to direct gunfire on land, sea, and in the air. This analog computer would have been used to direct the fire from the battleship's main guns, taking into account several factors, such as the speed of the targeted ship, the time it takes for a projectile to travel, and air resistance to the shells fired at a target. At the time the Montana class was set to begin construction, the rangekeepers had gained the ability to use radar data to help target enemy ships and land-based targets. This gave the US Navy a major advantage in World War II, as the Japanese did not develop radar or automated fire control to the level of the US Navy.

The large caliber guns were designed to fire two different 16-inch shells: an armor-piercing round for anti-ship and anti-structure work, and a high-explosive round designed for use against unarmored targets and shore bombardment. At , the Mk. 8 could penetrate  of vertical steel armor plate. For unarmored targets and shore bombardment, the  Mk. 13 HC (High-Capacity —referring to the large bursting charge) shell was available.

The final type of ammunition developed for the 16-inch guns, well after the Montanas had been cancelled, were W23 "Katie" shells. These were born from the nuclear deterrence that had begun to shape the US armed forces at the start of the Cold War. To compete with the United States Air Force and the United States Army, which had developed nuclear bombs and nuclear shells for use on the battlefield, the Navy began a top-secret program to develop Mk. 23 nuclear naval shells with an estimated yield of 15 to 20 kilotons. The shells entered development around 1953, and were reportedly ready by 1956; however, only the Iowa-class battleships could have fired them.

Secondary battery 
The secondary armament for Montana and her sisters was to be twenty /54 cal guns housed in ten turrets along the superstructure island of the battleship: five on the starboard side and five on the port. These guns, designed specifically for the Montanas, were to be the replacement for the /38 cal secondary gun batteries then in widespread use with the US Navy.

The 5-inch/54 cal gun turrets were similar to the 5-inch/38 cal gun mounts in that they were equally adept in an anti-aircraft role and for damaging smaller ships, but differed in that they weighed more and fired heavier rounds of ammunition at greater velocities, thus increasing their effectiveness. However, the heavier rounds resulted in faster crew fatigue than the 5-inch/38 cal guns.

The cancellation of the Montana-class battleships in 1943 pushed back the combat debut of the 5-inch/54 cal guns to 1945, when they were used aboard the US Navy's s. The guns proved adequate for the carrier's air defense, but they were gradually phased out of use by the carrier fleet because of their weight. (Rather than having the carrier defend itself by gunnery, this would be assigned to other surrounding ships within a carrier battle group.)

Anti-aircraft batteries 
While the Montana class was not designed principally for escorting the fast carrier task forces, they would have nonetheless been equipped with a wide array of anti-aircraft guns to protect themselves and other ships (principally the US aircraft carriers) from Japanese fighters and dive bombers. If commissioned, the ships were expected to mount a considerable array of Oerlikon 20 mm and Bofors 40 mm anti-aircraft weapons.

The Oerlikon 20 mm anti-aircraft cannon was one of the most heavily produced anti-aircraft guns of World War II; the US alone manufactured a total of 124,735 of these guns. When activated in 1941, these guns replaced the .50 in (12.7 mm)/90 cal M2 Browning MG on a one-for-one basis. The Oerlikon 20 mm AA gun remained the primary anti-aircraft weapon of the United States Navy until the introduction of the 40 mm Bofors AA gun in 1943.

These guns are air-cooled and use a gas blow-back recoil system. Unlike other automatic guns employed during World War II, the barrel of the 20 mm Oerlikon gun does not recoil; the breechblock is never locked against the breech and is actually moving forward when the gun fires. This weapon lacks a counter-recoil brake, as the force of the counter-recoil is checked by recoil from the firing of the next round of ammunition. Between December 1941 and September 1944, 32% of all Japanese aircraft downed were credited to this weapon, with the high point being 48% for the second half of 1942. In 1943, the revolutionary Mark 14 gunsight was introduced, which made these guns even more effective. The 20 mm guns, however, were found to be ineffective against the Japanese kamikaze attacks used during the latter half of World War II. They were subsequently phased out in favor of the heavier 40 mm Bofors AA guns.

The Bofors 40 mm anti-aircraft gun was used on almost every major warship in the US and UK fleet from about 1943 to 1945. Although a descendant of German, Dutch, and Swedish designs, the Bofors mounts used by the US Navy during World War II had been heavily Americanized to bring the guns up to the standards placed on them by the Navy. This resulted in a gun system set to British standards (now known as the Standard System) with interchangeable ammunition, which simplified the logistics situation for World War II. When coupled with hydraulic couple drives to reduce salt contamination and the Mark 51 director for improved accuracy, the Bofors 40 mm gun became a fearsome adversary, accounting for roughly half of all Japanese aircraft shot down between 1 October 1944 and 1 February 1945.

Propulsion
While less powerful than the  powerplant used by the Iowas, the Montanas plant enabled the machinery spaces to be considerably more subdivided, with extensive longitudinal and traverse subdivisions of the boiler and engine rooms. Two semi-balanced rudders were placed behind the two inboard screws. The inboard shafts were housed in skegs, which, while increasing hydrodynamic drag, substantially strengthened the stern structure.

To meet the high electrical loads anticipated for the ships, the design was to have ten 1,250 kW ship service turbogenerators (SSTG), providing a total of 12,500 kW of non-emergency electrical power at 450 volts alternating current. The ships were also to be equipped with two 500 kW emergency diesel generators.

Armor 
Aside from its firepower, a battleship's defining feature is its armor. The exact design and placement of the armor, inextricably linked with the ship's stability and performance, is a complex science honed over decades. A battleship is usually armored to withstand an attack from guns the size of its own, but the armor scheme of the preceding North Carolina class was only proof against  shells (which they had originally been intended to carry), while the South Dakota and Iowa classes were designed only to resist their original complement of   Mk. 5 shells, not the new "super-heavy"  Mk. 8 armor-piercing shells they actually used. The Montanas were the only US battleships designed to resist the Mk. 8.

As designed, the Montanas used the "all or nothing" armor philosophy, with most of the armor concentrated on the citadel that includes the machinery spaces, armament, magazines, and command and control facilities. Unlike the previous Iowa and South Dakota classes, the Montana class design returned to an external armor belt due to the greater beam providing sufficient stability while having the required belt inclination; this arrangement would have made construction and damage repairs much easier. The belt armor would be  Class A face-hardened Krupp cemented (K.C.) armor mounted on  Special Treatment Steel (STS), inclined at 19 degrees. Over the magazines, the splinter deck would be replaced by a  STS third deck to protect from spalling. Total armor thickness on the centerline would therefore have been 9.925 in (252 mm) over the citadel and 10.3 in (262 mm) thick over the magazines. The outboard section would have had  Class B laminated on  STS for a total of  second deck and a  splinter deck. The total thickness for the outboard section of the deck would have been 8.1 in (206 mm).

The turret sides were to have up to  Class A and turret roofs would have  Class B. The barbettes would have been protected by up to  Class A forward and  aft, while the conning tower sides would have  Class A.

Montanas torpedo protection system design incorporated lessons learned from those of previous US fast battleships, and was to consist of four internal longitudinal torpedo bulkheads behind the outer hull shell plating that would form a multi-layered "bulge". Two of the compartments would be liquid loaded in order to disrupt the gas bubble of a torpedo warhead detonation while the bulkheads would elastically deform and absorb the energy. Due to the external armor belt, the geometry of the "bulge" was more similar to that of the North Carolina class rather than that of the South Dakota and Iowa classes. Like on the South Dakota and Iowa classes, the two outer compartments would be liquid loaded, while two inner ones be void with the lower Class B armor belt to form the holding bulkhead between them.

Until the authorization of the Montana class, all US battleships were built within the size limits of the Panama Canal. The main reason for this was logistical: the largest US shipyards were located on the East Coast of the United States, while the United States had territorial interests in both oceans. Requiring the battleships to fit within the Panama Canal took days off the transition time from the Atlantic Ocean to the Pacific Ocean by allowing ships to move through the canal instead of sailing around South America. This shift in policy meant that the Montana class would have been the only World War II–era US battleships to be adequately armored against guns of the same power as their own.

Aircraft 

The Montana class would have used aircraft for reconnaissance and gunnery spotting. The type of aircraft used would have depended on when exactly the battleships would have been commissioned, but in all probability, they would have used either the Kingfisher or the Seahawk. The aircraft would have been floatplanes launched from catapults on the ship's fantail. They would have landed on the water and taxied to the stern of the ship to be lifted by a crane back to the catapult.

Kingfisher 
The Vought OS2U Kingfisher was a lightly armed two-man aircraft designed in 1937. The Kingfisher's high operating ceiling of  made it well-suited for its primary mission: to observe the fall of shot from a battleship's guns and radio corrections back to the ship. The floatplanes used in World War II also performed search and rescue for naval aviators who were shot down or forced to ditch in the ocean.

Seahawk
In June 1942, the US Navy Bureau of Aeronautics requested industry proposals for a new seaplane to replace the Kingfisher and Curtiss SO3C Seamew. The new aircraft was required to be able to use landing gear as well as floats. Curtiss submitted a design on 1 August and received a contract for two prototypes and five service-test aircraft on 25 August. The first flight of a prototype XSC-1 took place on 16 February 1944 at the Columbus, Ohio Curtiss plant. The first production aircraft were delivered in October 1944, and by the beginning of 1945, the single-seat Curtiss SC Seahawk floatplane began replacing the Kingfisher. Had the Montana class been completed, they would have arrived around the time of this replacement, and would likely have been equipped with the Seahawk for use in combat operations and seaborne search and rescue.

Ships 

Five ships of the Montana class were authorized on 19 July 1940, but they were suspended indefinitely until being cancelled on 21 July 1943. The ships were to be built at the New York Navy Yard, Philadelphia Navy Yard, and Norfolk Navy Yard.

USS Montana (BB-67) 
Montana was planned to be the lead ship of the class. She was to be the third ship named in honor of the 41st state, and she was assigned to the Philadelphia Navy Yard. Both the earlier battleship, and BB-67 were cancelled, so Montana is the only one of the (48 at the time) US states never to have had a battleship with a "BB" hull classification completed in its honor.

USS Ohio (BB-68) 
Ohio was to be the second Montana-class battleship. She was to be named in honor of the 17th state, and she was assigned to the Philadelphia Navy Yard for construction. Ohio would have been the fourth ship to bear that name had she been commissioned.

USS Maine (BB-69) 
Maine was to be the third Montana-class battleship. She was to be named in honor of the 23rd state, and she was assigned to the New York Navy Yard. Maine would have been the third ship to bear that name had she been commissioned.

USS New Hampshire (BB-70) 
New Hampshire was to be the fourth Montana-class battleship. She was to be named in honor of the ninth state, and she was assigned to the New York Navy Yard. New Hampshire would have been the third ship to bear that name had she been commissioned.

USS Louisiana (BB-71) 
Louisiana was to be the fifth and final Montana-class battleship. She was to be named in honor of the 18th state, and she was assigned to the Norfolk Navy Yard, Portsmouth, Virginia. Louisiana would have been the third ship to bear that name had she been commissioned. By hull number, Louisiana was the last American battleship authorized for construction.

See also

 H-class battleship proposals – comparable German battleship design (cancelled)
 Design A-150 battleship – comparable Japanese battleship design follow-on to the Yamato (cancelled)
  – comparable battleship design of the Royal Navy (first two ships laid down, both scrapped due to the start of the war in Europe)
 Maximum battleship - a series of designs produced at the request of a United States senator

Notes

References

Further reading 
 
 
 Keegan, John; Ellis, Chris; Natkiel, Richard (2001). World War II: A Visual Encyclopedia. PRC Publishing Ltd. .
 Muir, Malcolm Jr. (October 1990). "Rearming in a Vacuum: United States Navy Intelligence and the Japanese Capital Ship Threat, 1936–1945". The Journal of Military History, Vol. 54, No. 4.
 Naval Historical Foundation [2000] (2004). The Navy. New York: Barnes & Noble Inc. .

External links 

 Firing procedure for the 16"/50 (40.6 cm) Mark 7
 A comparison of seven battleship classes during WWII
 Naval History and Heritage Command: Montana Class (BB-67 through BB-71) 1941 Building Program
 NavSource Online: Battleship Photo Archive

 

 
Battleship classes
Cancelled ships of the United States Navy